Phantoms is a 1998 American science fiction horror film adapted from Dean Koontz's 1983 novel of the same name. Directed by Joe Chappelle with a screenplay by Koontz, the film stars Peter O'Toole, Rose McGowan, Joanna Going, Liev Schreiber, Ben Affleck, Nicky Katt and Clifton Powell. The film takes place in the peaceful town of Snowfield, Colorado, where something evil has wiped out the community. It is up to a group of people to stop it or at least get out of Snowfield alive.

While Koontz's novel included many literary tips of the hat to the work of H. P. Lovecraft, these are largely excised from the film.

Phantoms was filmed on location in Georgetown, Colorado. The Hotel de Paris Museum was used to depict the bakery and hotel where several scenes were set.

Plot

Dr. Jennifer Pailey brings her sister Lisa to the resort town of Snowfield, Colorado, a small ski resort village nestled in the Rocky Mountains where Jenny works as a doctor. Once in town, the sisters find no one around but a few corpses. At first their suspicions are that of a serial killer on the loose in town. The sisters stumble upon the severed heads of the town baker and his wife in an oven when they are found by Sheriff Bryce Hammond, a former FBI agent, and his deputies Stu Wargle and Steve Shanning.  Hammond and his deputies are investigating the killings.

The group arrives at a nearby hotel and find the writing of a victim on the mirror reading "Timothy Flyte". Shanning leaves to investigate a sound outside but doesn't return. The others find only his gun, hat and shoes while the rest of him is gone. They return to the sheriff's office to request aid and create roadblocks around Snowfield. The group gets a strange phone call but are interrupted by an attack by a bizarre moth-like creature that rips Wargle's face off before Hammond is able to kill it. Lisa later encounters Wargle while in the bathroom. They quickly return to the morgue and find his body missing.

Hammond's FBI associates find Flyte, a British academic who theorizes the town has fallen victim to the Ancient Enemy, an entity he generalizes as "chaos in the flesh".  It periodically wipes out civilizations including that of the Mayans and the Roanoke Island colonists.

They are soon joined by an Army commando unit and a group of scientists led by General Copperfield who has come to Snowfield. They, along with Flyte, investigate the town. The creature kills soldiers investigating the sewers, while a dog approaches Flyte and the scientists and transforms into a gruesome monster that converts the group, except for Flyte. Flyte regroups with Hammond, Jenny, Lisa, and Copperfield. The creature attacks Copperfield through a manhole, converting him. Copperfield vomits a sample before melting into a puddle of black liquid. Through it, Flyte and the group learn the nature of the Ancient Enemy.

Revealed to actually be an Earth-based amoebic life form that mimics its absorbed victims while gaining their knowledge, the Enemy creates Phantoms as temporary detachments for it to act through before absorbing them back into it. Furthermore, the Enemy absorbs all of the thoughts of its victims, making it extremely intelligent, and because of the previous civilizations' perception of it, it believes itself to be a god. It had arranged all of the prior events so Flyte can assist the creature in revealing its existence to the world. Flyte also learns that the creature's body is physiologically almost identical to crude oil, and could be killed by bacteria bio-engineered to ingest fossil fuels. They deduce that with the limited amount of the bacteria they have, they need to get the bacteria into the nucleus that is within the main body of the Enemy.

They form a plan to use the Ancient Enemy's extreme arrogance and god complex against itself. To do so, Flyte acts as if he is turning against the group by revealing their entire plan to the Enemy. In anger (and believing itself indestructible due to being a god), it reabsorbs all the Phantoms and then emerges from the sewers to assume a Mother Mass form.  Hammond and the Pailey sisters fire the bacteria into the Ancient Enemy before it retreats underground with Hammond in pursuit.

While the Pailey sisters find themselves dealing with Wargle's Phantom, Jenny seemingly kills it with a gun containing the bacteria. Hammond finds the Ancient Enemy as it has assumed the form of the boy he accidentally killed during an FBI drug raid. When the boy grabs the last vial from him, Hammond shoots at it to expose the creature to its contents. It dies from the bacteria.

Though Hammond reassures Lisa and Jenny that it is gone, with the former stating the townsfolk are at peace, Flyte admits the Ancient Enemy did achieve its victory as he has decided to tell the world what happened with a book based on what occurred in Snowfield. Some time later, watching Flyte being interviewed about his book, The Ancient Enemy, two bar patrons argue about the existence of alien life. Hearing laughter nearby, the patrons turn to see Wargle as he asks them if they want to see something interesting.

Cast
 Peter O'Toole as Dr. Timothy Flyte
 Rose McGowan as Lisa Pailey
 Joanna Going as Dr. Jennifer Pailey
 Liev Schreiber as Deputy Stu Wargle
 Ben Affleck as Sheriff Bryce Hammond
 Nicky Katt as Deputy Steve Shanning
 Clifton Powell as General Leland Copperfield
 Rick Otto as Dr. Lockland
 Valerie Chow as Dr. Yamaguchi
 Adam Nelson as Dr. Burke
 John Hammil as Dr. Talbot
 John Scott Clough as Dr. Shane
 William Hahn as Dr. Borman
 Robert Himber as Dr. Walker
 Bo Hopkins as FBI Agent Hawthorne
 Robert Knepper as FBI Agent Wilson
 Linnea Quigley as Woman In Room 204

Production
The rights to Koontz' book were initially purchased by producer Steven lane, a producer on the The Howling series.

Reception
Phantoms received a 13% rating on Rotten Tomatoes, based on 31 reviews. Roger Ebert gave the film 1 star out of 4, saying: "If only we could learn to think more kindly of those who digest us, this movie could have ended happily". The film grossed $5.6 million at the box office.

See also
The Stuff
X the Unknown
The X-Files (film)

References

External links
 
 
 
 

1998 films
1998 horror films
1990s science fiction horror films
American science fiction horror films
Films based on American horror novels
Films set in Colorado
Films shot in Colorado
1990s monster movies
American post-apocalyptic films
American zombie films
Dimension Films films
Films based on works by Dean Koontz
Films directed by Joe Chappelle
Films produced by Joel Soisson
1990s English-language films
1990s American films